Stone Monkey may refer to:

Sun Wukong, the Monkey King, a character in the Chinese novel Journey to the West.
The Stone Monkey, a novel by Jeffery Deaver.